Pelican Township is the name of some places in the U.S. state of Minnesota:
Pelican Township, Crow Wing County, Minnesota
Pelican Township, Otter Tail County, Minnesota

See also

 Pelican Lake Township, Grant County, Minnesota

Minnesota township disambiguation pages